is a Japanese actress, model, and gravure idol who has acted in a number of films, television series, radio and theatre productions, as well as modelling for magazines and videos.

Born in Niigata Prefecture, she is represented with Anthem.

Biography
She started acting from the age of nine. Since then, she belongs to her office from 2009 and made full-scale tarento activities. From 2011 she enrolled as a member of the idol group "Bless" until April 2013.

She won the 2012 Miss Young Champion Grand Prix.

After that she moved her activities to female magazines and served as a regular model of Tokuma Shoten's Larme.

She resumed gravure activities at the 49th issue of Weekly Playboy in 2016. In the same year Weekly Young Magazine's No. 51 was published, in which she appeared in a youth manga magazine for the first time in four years. In 2017, she appeared in the cover and top gravure of the ninth issue of Weekly Young Magazine. In both magazines she was published as a newcomer, but since her junior idol era and Miss Young Champion era, she has been analysed as a late bloom gravure idol.

She appeared on Young Champion's No. 8 cover in March 2017. It was written on the page as a "triumphant appearance."

Personal life
She is good friends with Miyu Inamori and Ami Tomite, and they often appear on their blogs as well.

She has two elder brothers (six and three years older).

Works

Image videos
Hajimemashite Sarii Ikegami desu! (5 Feb 2010, Shibuya Music)
Marshmallow Kinenbi 14-sai-chū 2 (4 Jun 2010, Shibuya Music)
Boku no Taiyō (24 Dec 2010, Spice Visual)
Boku no Kōhai wa Sarii-chan Sarii Ikegami 15-sai-chū 3 (14 Apr 2011, Silk)
white -Menazashi- (24 Dec 2011, Orstack Soft Hanbai)
Anniversarii (5 Feb 2010, BNS)
Miss Young Champion 2012 (5 Feb 2010, E-Net Frontier)
Sarii Smile (5 Feb 2010, Shinyusha)

Appearances

Dramas
2015; CX Yōkoso, Wagaya e as Nakano Electronic Parts employee (regular)
2016; Hulu Debusen as Yaku Kan (regular); television version broadcast at NTV (Kanto Local)
2017; FOD Kuzu no Honkai as Sanae Ebato (regular); broadcast at Fuji TV (Kanto Local)
2017; EX Kyotaro Nishimura Travel Mystery 67 Hakone Kōyō—Satsui no Tabi as Sanae Sakagami
2018; Bungaku Shojo; as Tanizaki Kyoka
2018; Silent Voice; as Mari Kido

Films
Kuchisake Onna; Director: Koji Shiraishi
2010; Hatano-gumi SP: Episode V
2013; Miss Yang Chang Academy - Iidabashi Girls High School ~Todoke! Otome no Omoi~ Kiss-bu; Director: Yoji Unno (as Sarii)
2017; Itazurana Kiss The Movie: Campus; as Ayako Matsumoto
2018; Soratobu Tire; as Kadota's girlfriend
2018; Inuyashiki; as Misaki Matsubara

Radio
3 Apr 2017 –; FM-Niigata77.5 Pikaichi presents Beauty Diary (Mon–Thu 21:55– (5-minute programme) OA!)

Television
19 Apr, 16 May 2016; EX Zenryoku-zaka Awajizaka; Kichirōzaka
24 Apr 2017; CX Tsūkai TV Sukatto Japan Mune Kyuns Sukatto ~Hoshi ni Negai o…~ as Terumi Sakamoto
29 May 2017; CX Tsūkai TV Sukatto Japan Mune Kyuns Sukatto ~Jibun ni Uchikate! Kyūdō-bu~ as Misaki Hamada

Theatre
Happy Go Unlucky: Tsuki-gumi as Shinju Nogura (12–16 Oct 2011; Ikebukuro Theater Kassai)
Pajama de Ojama~Kōshū Joshi Ryō Monogatari (28–30 Apr 2012; Takadanobaba Rabinest)
Utsuke: Kako-hen: Ichiya as Garasha Hosokawa (12–15 Feb 2015; Ikebukuro Theatre Green Big Tree Theatre)
Happy Go Unlucky as Ruri (17–22 Jun 2015; Geki Underground Liberty)
Kokoro wa Kodokuna Atom; starring: as Girl Ayako (22, 24, 25 Oct 2015; Ikebukuro Theatre Green Big Tree Theatre/14, 15 Nov 2015 Osaka ABC Hall)

Magazines
Fashion magazine Larme regular model
Free newspaper Midka; front page; 1 Feb 2015
Released 17 Mar 2015 No. 15—Regular Larme ~Sweet Girl Artbook~
Released 17 Mar 2015 No. 15 Larme ~Sweet Girl Artbook~ Hair Arrange plan–Beauty feature
Released 17 Mar 2015 No. 16 Larme ~Sweet Girl Artbook~ New Models–Yukata Hair Arrange
Released 17 Mar 2015 No. 17 Larme ~Sweet Girl Artbook~ Hair Catalogue plan–Prefecture Snap plan
20 Jun, 20 Sep 2015 Digital Camera Magazine Issues July, September
23 Jun, 23 Jul 2015 Soup Issues August, September
20 Nov 2015 LuRe First Issue
20 Dec 2015 Photo Technique Digital January Issue
20 Jan 2016 Photo Technique Digital February Issue
19 Mar 2016 Young Magazine No. 16; End Gravure
9 May 2016 Young Magazine No. 23; End Gravure
20 May 2016 Monthly Young Magazine No. 6; End Gravure
1 Aug 2016 Young Magazine No. 35; End Gravure
21 Nov 2016 Young Magazine No. 51; End Gravure
21 Nov 2016 Weekly Playboy No.49; Gravure
28 Nov 2016 #girl Magazine
30 Jan 2017 Young Magazine No. 9; Cover & Top Feature Gravure
17 Feb 2017 Young Gangan Gravure in progress
25 Feb 2017 Big Gangan gravure
19 Jun 2017 Weekly Playboy No.27; Gravure
20 Jun 2017 Digital Camera Magazine: Weekend Girl July Issue

Stage shows
5th Teens Collection; Maihama Amphitheater; 23 Mar 2015; Fashion show appearance .
2nd Flying summer; KFC; 2 May 2015; Fashion show appearance

Others
Daiichi Kosho Company "Karaoke Sentai Utaunger"

Publications

Calendars
Sarii Ikegami 2018-Nen Calendar (2017, Try-X)

References

External links
 – affiliation office 
Itoh Company - Official Agency Profile 

Japanese gravure idols
Models from Niigata Prefecture
1995 births
Living people